The Greatest Video Game Music, performed by the London Philharmonic Orchestra, features classical orchestrations of video game themes including those from Super Mario Bros., Call of Duty, Metal Gear Solid, Final Fantasy, Halo, World of Warcraft, Angry Birds and many more. A sequel, The Greatest Video Game Music 2 was released a year later.

Reception
It was named Rolling Stones "weirdest hit album" of 2011, and debuted at #23 on the Billboard 200 - the highest debut for an orchestral release since 2005's Star Wars: Episode III – Revenge of the Sith soundtrack.

Track listing
Advent Rising: Muse
Legend of Zelda: Suite
Call of Duty: Modern Warfare 2 Theme
Angry Birds: Main Theme
Final Fantasy VIII: Liberi Fatali
Super Mario Bros.: Themes
Uncharted: Drake's Fortune: Nate's Theme
Grand Theft Auto IV: Soviet Connection
World of Warcraft: Seasons of War
Metal Gear Solid 2: Sons of Liberty Theme
Tetris Theme (Korobeiniki)
Battlefield 2: Theme
The Elder Scrolls IV: Oblivion
Call of Duty 4: Modern Warfare Main Menu Theme
Mass Effect 2: Suicide Mission
Splinter Cell: Conviction
Final Fantasy: Main Theme
BioShock: The Ocean on His Shoulders
Halo 3: One Final Effort
Fallout 3: Theme
Super Mario Galaxy: Gusty Garden Galaxy
Dead Space: Welcome Aboard the U.S.G. Ishimura [Amazon Exclusive]
Final Fantasy XIII: Hanging Edge [iTunes Exclusive]
Enemy Zero: The Last Movement [bonus track]

Sequels

Greatest Video Game Music 2 
 Greatest Video Game Music 2, performed by the London Philharmonic Orchestra, features classical orchestrations of video game themes including those from Assassin's Creed, The Elder Scrolls V: Skyrim, Final Fantasy, Halo, Portal and many more. It is a sequel to the compilation album Greatest Video Game Music.

Track List 
 Assassin's Creed: Revelations: Main Theme
 The Elder Scrolls V: Skyrim: Far Horizons
 The Legend of Zelda: The Wind Waker: Dragon Roost Island
 Final Fantasy VII: One-Winged Angel
 Mass Effect 3: A Future for the Krogan / An End Once and for All
 Halo: Never Forget / Peril
 Sonic the Hedgehog: A Symphonic Suite
 Chrono Trigger: Main Theme
 Luigi's Mansion: Main Theme
 Kingdom Hearts Birth by Sleep: Fate of the Unknown
 Super Metroid: A Symphonic Poem
 Diablo III: Overture
 Batman: Arkham City: Main Theme
 Deus Ex: Human Revolution: Icarus Main Theme
 Fez: Adventure
 Portal: Still Alive
 LittleBigPlanet: Orb of Dreamers (The Cosmic Imagisphere)

Greatest Video Game Music III: Choral Edition 
 Greatest Video Game Music III: Choral Edition, performed by Orphei Drängar and Myrra Malmberg, features classical orchestrations of video game themes including those from Assassin's Creed, The Elder Scrolls V: Skyrim, Final Fantasy, God of War III, Minecraft and many more. It is a sequel to the compilation album Greatest Video Game Music 2.

Track List 
 Final Fantasy X - Hymn of the Fayth
 World of Warcraft - Invincible
 Skyrim - Age of Oppression
 Final Fantasy X - Hymn of the Fayth (Remix 1)
 Dragon Age Inquisition - Main Theme
 God of War 3 - Anthem of the Dead
 The Last of Us - The Choice
 Skyrim - Dragonborn
 Final Fantasy X - Hymn of the Fayth (Remix 2)
 Portal - Still Alive
 Portal 2 - Cara Mia Addio
 Assassin's Creed IV - The Parting Glass
 Minecraft - Sweden

Notes

 A  "Metal Gear Solid 2: Sons of Liberty Theme" is mislabeled "Metal Gear Solid: Sons of Liberty Theme" on the back cover
 B  "The Elder Scrolls IV: Oblivion" is mislabeled "Elder Scrolls: Oblivion" on the back cover
 C  "Mass Effect 2: Suicide Mission" is mislabeled "Mass Effect: Suicide Mission" on the back cover
 D  The track "Battlefield 2: Theme" is actually a re-orchestration of the Battlefield 1943 main menu music, itself a remake of "Battlefield 1942 Soundtrack–Main Theme" by Joel Eriksson, to whom the song on the album is credited.

References

External links
www.x5musicgroup.com

X5 Music Group albums
2011 albums
2011 classical albums
Video game soundtracks
London Philharmonic Orchestra albums